Lope: The Outlaw is a 2010 Spanish-Brazilian adventure drama film directed by Andrucha Waddington which stars Alberto Ammann, Leonor Watling and Pilar López de Ayala. The film is a co-production between Spain and Brazil, inspired in the youth of Lope de Vega.

Plot
Biopic of the poet and playwright Lope de Vega. Set in 1588, Lope is a young soldier who has just arrived in Madrid from the war. The city is still under construction and he, like many others, still does not know which path to follow. While struggling with his restlessness and ambition, two women come into his life. One, a liberal and successful businesswoman who can help Lope with his career, and the other, an aristocrat who ends up being his true lover.

Cast

Production 
The film was produced by Antena 3 Films, El Toro Pictures, Ikiru Films and Conspiraçao Filmes. Ricardo Della Rosa was responsible for cinematography and Sergio Mekler for film editing. Shooting locations included the Madrid region, Toledo and the Atlantic coast of Morocco (Essaouira and Safi).

Release 
Distributed by Twentieth Century Fox, the film premiered on 3 September 2010.

Awards and nominations 

|-
| align = "center" rowspan = "11" | 2011 || 16th Forqué Awards || colspan = "2" | Best Film ||  || 
|-
| rowspan = "7" | 25th Goya Awards || Best Original Song || "Que el soneto nos tome por sorpresa" by Jorge Drexler ||  || rowspan = "7" | 
|-
| Best Supporting Actress || Pilar López de Ayala || 
|-
| Best Production Supervision || Edmon Roch, Toni Novella || 
|-
| Best Art Direction || César Macarrón || 
|-
| Best Costume Design || Tatiana Hernández || 
|-
| Best Makeup and Hairstyles || Karmele Soler, Martín Macías Trujillo, Paco Rodríguez H. || 
|-
| Best Special Effects || Raúl Romanillos, Marcelo Siqueira || 
|-
| rowspan = "3" | 20th Actors and Actresses Union Awards || Best Film Actress in a Minor Role || Pilar López de Ayala ||  || rowspan = "3" | 
|-
| rowspan = "2" | Best Film Actor in a Minor Role || Antonio de la Torre || 
|-
| Juan Diego || 
|}

See also 
 List of Spanish films of 2010
 List of Brazilian films of 2010

References
Citations

Bibliography

External links
  
 

2010 biographical drama films
2010 films
Spanish biographical drama films
Brazilian biographical drama films
Films directed by Andrucha Waddington
Films set in Madrid
Films shot in the Community of Madrid
Films shot in Morocco
Films scored by Fernando Velázquez
Biographical films about dramatists and playwrights
Ikiru Films films
Atresmedia Cine films
2010s Spanish films